Concerto for Group and Orchestra is a live album by Deep Purple and the Royal Philharmonic Orchestra conducted by Malcolm Arnold, recorded at the Royal Albert Hall, London, in September 1969. It consists of a concerto composed by Jon Lord, with lyrics written by Ian Gillan. This is the first full length album to feature Ian Gillan on vocals and Roger Glover on bass. It was released on vinyl in December 1969. The original performance included three additional Deep Purple songs, "Hush", "Wring That Neck", and "Child in Time"; these were included on a 2002 release. This was the last Deep Purple album distributed in the US by Tetragrammaton Records, which went defunct shortly after.

The 1969 performance was among the first combinations of rock music with a full orchestra, predating works such as Procol Harum Live: In Concert with the Edmonton Symphony Orchestra (1972), Rick Wakeman's Journey to the Centre of the Earth (1974), Caravan and the New Symphonia (1974), Mike Oldfield's Exposed (1979), Metallica's S&M concert (1999) and Stewart Copeland's Orchestralli (2004).

The original score for the concerto was lost in 1970; however, it was performed again in 1999 with a recreated score, and has been performed several times since.

Original 1969 Royal Albert Hall performance
The piece was first performed and recorded on 24 September 1969 in the Royal Albert Hall, London, by Deep Purple and The Royal Philharmonic Orchestra, conducted by Malcolm Arnold. The programme consisted of:
{{Track listing
| extra_column = Performer(s)
| title1       = Symphony No. 6, Op. 95
| note1        = Malcolm Arnold)• 1st Movement: Energico (9:19) • 2nd Movement: Lento (8:52) • 3rd Movement: Con Fuoco (7:02)
| length1      = 25:13
| extra1       = The Royal Philharmonic Orchestra
| title2       = Hush
| note2        = Joe South
| extra2       = Deep Purple
| length2      = 4:42
| title3       = Wring That Neck
| note3        = Ritchie Blackmore, Nick Simper, Jon Lord, Ian Paice
| extra3       = Deep Purple
| length3      = 13:23
| title4       = Child in Time
| note4        = Blackmore, Ian Gillan, Roger Glover, Lord, Paice
| extra4       = Deep Purple
| length4      = 12:06
| title5       = Concerto for Group and Orchestra
| note5        = Jon Lord (with lyrics by Ian Gillan)• First Movement: Moderato – Allegro (19:23) • Second Movement: Andante (19:11) • Third Movement: Vivace – Presto (13:09)
| extra5       = Deep Purple  with  The Royal Philharmonic Orchestra
| length5      = 51:43
| title6       = Parts of the Concerto'''s "Third Movement
| note6        = Given as an encore.
| length6      = 5:53
}}

ConcertoConcerto for Group and Orchestra is split into three movements.
 First movement (Moderato – Allegro): After an extended orchestral introduction, the group and orchestra work as separate blocks, trying to get dominance over the main theme and working as antagonists to each other. There are cadenzas for electric guitar and clarinet.
 Second movement (Andante), with lyrics sung by Ian Gillan: This movement is based around two tunes that are played in various different arrangements by the orchestra and the group, individually and together. After a combined pop / blues version of the second tune, there is an organ cadenza followed by a quiet ending by the orchestra.
 Third movement (Vivace – Presto): Apart from Ian Paice's drum solo, the music combines the orchestra and group together in a "free for all". The movement alternates between 6/8 and 2/4 time signatures. 

The Concerto was first performed at the Albert Hall in London on 24 September 1969 with Deep Purple and The Royal Philharmonic Orchestra conducted by Malcolm Arnold. It was performed at second time at the Hollywood Bowl on 25 August 1970, with the Los Angeles Philharmonic Orchestra conducted by Lawrence Foster, after which the score was lost.

ReleasesConcerto for Group and Orchestra was released on vinyl in December 1969 in the United States (Tetragrammaton) and in January 1970 in the United Kingdom (Harvest). These releases contained only the "Concerto", with the second movement broken in two-halves. Copies of the original US editions are rare as Tetragrammaton went bankrupt while the album was still being issued. In the following year, the Concerto became the only Tetragrammaton release to be reissued by Warner Bros., Deep Purple's new US label. On 4 April 1970 the Concerto was shown on British television as The Best of Both Worlds. 
The 1990s saw a CD release including the songs "Wring That Neck" and "Child in Time". In 2002 EMI released special edition DVD-A, SACD and two-CD sets of Concerto for Group and Orchestra, featuring the entire program of music played that night. In 2003 a video recording of this concert was released on DVD. However, four and a half minutes of the 1st Movement are missing in this video, as it was taken straight from the BBC's 4 April 1970 broadcast of the event (see above). The edit was in the original BBC broadcast.

Track listing

1999 Royal Albert Hall performances

On 25 and 26 September 1999, thirty years after its initial performance, the Concerto was again performed in front of a live audience in the Royal Albert Hall. To make this performance possible, a new score was created by Lord with the assistance of Paul Mann and Marco de Goeij by listening to the recording and watching the video of the 1969 performance. Performers were:

The London Symphony Orchestra, conducted by Paul Mann

The programme consisted of:Four Scottish Dances (Malcolm Arnold), performed by the London Symphony Orchestra
"Pictured Within", performed by Jon Lord and Miller Anderson
"Wait A While", performed by Jon Lord and Sam Brown
"Sitting in a Dream", performed by Roger Glover and Ronnie James Dio
"Love Is All", performed by Roger Glover and Ronnie James Dio
"Via Miami", performed by Ian Gillan
"That's Why God Is Singing the Blues", performed by Ian Gillan
"Night Meets Light", performed by The Steve Morse Band
"Take It off the Top", performed by The Steve Morse Band
"Wring That Neck", performed by Ian Paice & The Kick HornsConcerto for Group and Orchestra (Jon Lord with lyrics by Ian Gillan), performed by Deep Purple and The London Symphony Orchestra
"First Movement: Moderato – Allegro" (19:23)
"Second Movement: Andante" (19:11)
"Third Movement: Vivace – Presto" (13:09)
"Ted the Mechanic", performed by Deep Purple and The London Symphony Orchestra
"Watching the Sky", performed by Deep Purple and The London Symphony Orchestra
"Sometimes I Feel Like Screaming", performed by Deep Purple and The London Symphony Orchestra
"Pictures Of Home", performed by Deep Purple and The London Symphony Orchestra
"Smoke on the Water", performed by the evening's entire ensemble

A recording of the concert was released on a double CD as Live at the Royal Albert Hall. A cut recording of the performance was also released on DVD, entitled In Concert with the London Symphony Orchestra.

2000–2001 tour
Encouraged by the success of the 1999 performances, Deep Purple took the Concerto on tour, first performing it in South America with local orchestras, then in Europe with the George Enescu Philharmonic Orchestra, in Japan with the New Japan Philharmonic Orchestra, all conducted by Paul Mann.

40th anniversary performance
On 24 September 2009 Jon Lord joined the RTÉ Concerto Orchestra in the National Concert Hall, Dublin, Ireland to celebrate the 40th anniversary of the first performance of Concerto for Group and Orchestra. Also performed, were pieces from Jon Lord's solo career and a number of Deep Purple songs including an orchestral version of Child In Time.

Further performances
The score of the concerto having been recreated, groups and orchestras across the world were free to perform it:

2012 studio version
In October 2012 a studio version of the Concerto for Group and Orchestra was released. The recording features the Royal Liverpool Philharmonic Orchestra conducted by Paul Mann. The soloists are Jon Lord (organ), Darin Vasilev (guitar in the 1st movement), Joe Bonamassa (guitar in the 2nd movement), Steve Morse (guitar in the 3rd movement), Steve Balsamo, Kasia Łaska, and Bruce Dickinson (vocals), Brett Morgan (drums), and Guy Pratt (bass). The orchestral parts were recorded at the Philharmonic Hall, Liverpool on 1 and 2 June 2011. The band parts were recorded in August and October 2011 and also in May 2012. The album was mixed at Abbey Road Studios in late May 2012. According to Paul Mann, Jon Lord heard the final master of the recording a few days before his death on 16 July 2012.

Reception

Malcolm Arnold's views
In an interview for hospital radio in Huddersfield in 1970, shortly after the Royal Albert Hall performance, Arnold provided a positive take on the experience:

Ritchie Blackmore's views
In a 1979 interview with Sounds magazine Blackmore said:

 Trivia 

The cover art of the Swedish heavy metal band Opeth's 2010 concert DVD In Live Concert at the Royal Albert Hall is intentionally similar in layout, coulour and motive to that of Deep Purple's Concerto for Group and Orchestra'', "underlining Opeth's longstanding love for their prog-rock roots".

Personnel
Jon Lord: keyboards
Ritchie Blackmore: guitar
Ian Gillan: vocals
Roger Glover: bass
Ian Paice: drums 
Royal Philharmonic Orchestra: orchestral instruments 
Malcolm Arnold: conductor

Charts
Original album (1969)

Reunion performance (1999)

Jon Lord's studio version (2012)

References

External links
1969 performance (& recording)
1999 performance (& recording)
1999 performance (& recording)
Vincent Budd, The Gemini Man: an Introduction to the Orchestral Works of Jon Lord, 2003, Gnosis Press 

Compositions by Jon Lord
Group and Orchestra, Concerto for
Deep Purple video albums
Live albums recorded at the Royal Albert Hall
2003 video albums
1969 live albums
Live video albums
Warner Records live albums
Harvest Records live albums
Deep Purple live albums
Polydor Records live albums
Tetragrammaton Records live albums
Albums produced by Jon Lord
Albums produced by Ritchie Blackmore
Albums produced by Ian Gillan
Albums produced by Roger Glover
Albums produced by Ian Paice
Albums conducted by Malcolm Arnold
Classical crossover albums
Lost musical works